Mars class may refer to:

Real ship and boat classes
  (20th century) of the U.S. Navy
  (18th century; 74-gun third rate) of the British Royal Navy
  (18th century) of the Royal French Navy; see List of ships of the line of France
  (Military Afloat Reach and Sustainability; 20th century) of the Royal Fleet Auxiliary of the British Royal Navy

Fictional ship and boat classes
 Mars-class starship, of the Federation Starfleet in Star Trek; see Star Trek: Discovery (season 3)

See also
 Human mission to Mars, for proposed Mars-capable (Mars "class", "Mars" ship) spaceship designs
 Mars (disambiguation)